Gujral is a Punjabi Khatri last name. Notable people with the surname include:

 Feroze Gujral, Indian model
 I. K. Gujral (1919–2012), Indian politician
 Namrata Singh Gujral (born 1976), American actress
 Naresh Gujral (born 1948), Indian politician
 Satish Gujral (born 1925), Indian artist

References

Indian surnames
Surnames of Indian origin
Punjabi-language surnames
Hindu surnames
Khatri clans
Khatri surnames
Punjabi tribes